S. tumefaciens may refer to:
 Stalagmites tumefaciens, an ascomycete fungus
 Sphaeropsis tumefaciens, an ascomycete fungus that is a plant pathogen infecting citruses